Northern Ireland rugby union team could refer to:
 Ireland national rugby union team (Irish rugby is administered on an all-Ireland basis)
 Ulster Rugby (representing all nine counties of Ulster)
 North of Ireland Football Club (rugby union)

See also   
 Rugby union in Ireland and :Category:Rugby union in Ireland